Rear Admiral  Iskinder Desta (6 August 1934 – 23 November 1974) was a member of the Ethiopian Imperial family and naval officer. A grandson of Emperor Haile Selassie I, he served as the Deputy Commander of the Imperial Ethiopian Navy, its most senior officer, from 1958 until his execution by the Derg in 1974.

Early life and education
(Prince) Iskinder (also Iskander/Eskander) was born on 6 August 1934 in Addis Ababa, the child of Ras Desta Damtew, a senior military commander and noble, and Princess Tenagnework, daughter of Emperor Haile Selassie I. In 1935, not long after his birth, the imperial family was forced to flee the Fascist Italian invasion into exile in Bath, Somerset; Ras Desta remained in the country to command the imperial forces fighting in the south of the country and was captured and executed in 1937. Iskinder was educated primarily in the United Kingdom. Desta was at Wellington College  1948-1951 (Wellington College Register).

Military career
In 1952, Iskinder entered as a candidate in the Britannia Royal Naval College and passed as a midshipman. In 1955 he was commissioned into the newly established Imperial Ethiopian Navy as a sub-lieutenant, and in 1958, at the age of 21, he was made its Deputy Commander, with the rank of Commander. Despite his reputation as a "vigorous and progressive" commander and ties to the Imperial Family, Iskinder was a minor figure in Ethiopian politics. While some sources suggest that Iskinder was a possible successor to Emperor Haile Selassie, others maintain the emperor did not trust him and did not give him significant positions of responsibility.  As a result Iskinder often performed minor governmental duties such as serving on the Executive Committee of the International Christian Fellowship and representing the Emperor at foreign royal events, such as in 1960, the celebrations for the 500th anniversary of the death of Prince Henry the Navigator in Portugal and the wedding of King Baudouin and Queen Fabiola of Belgium. 

One source even claims that Iskender worked to curry support among the officer corps and educated civilians by sponsoring scholarships in the 1960s and 1970s, and that on 14 September 1973, Eskinder hijacked the imperial plane and held the Emperor at gunpoint in an attempt to force a change to the succession.  This is contradicted by others who maintain that the Prince remained close to his grandfather to the end, and had dinner with him almost daily.

Following a naval mutiny of 25-26 February 1974, he fled the naval base in Massawa, staying in Djibouti for a few weeks until called back to Addis Ababa on 8 March. On 12 September, when the Emperor was overthrown by the Derg, Iskinder was placed into detention by the military junta.  He was one of sixty imperial officials executed on 23 November 1974.

Personal life

He was married to Leult (Princess) Sofia Amanuel, daughter of 'Ato Amanuel Abraham, GCVO, Minister of Education. They had one daughter, Naomi Iskinder, born in 1969.

Ancestry

References

Ethiopian nobility
Ethiopian military personnel
Executed military personnel
Executed Ethiopian people
1934 births
1974 deaths